Backgammon is a 1988 computer version of the strategy board game published by Atari UK.

Gameplay
Backgammon is a game in which backgammon is played on the Atari ST. It features ten levels of play, a facility for action replay, and an ability to take back and restore the last move.

This game was part of Atari's Mindgames Series.

Reception

Brian Walker reviewed Backgammon for Games International magazine, and gave it 2 stars out of 5, and stated that "To sum up; the program does not even reach intermediate level. Perhaps it might offer something if you learned the game over a plate of souvlaki and chips on a Greek island and wish to advance your understanding somewhat."

The Games Machine found this game "dull" but conceded that it might be good for improving a player's skills at backgammon, but felt that players would have more fun on a real board.

John Sweeney for Page 6 found that this version of Backgammon was "probably best for beginners" due to the ability to set the difficulty level.

References

1988 video games
Atari ST games
Atari ST-only games
Backgammon video games
Video games developed in the United Kingdom